Bethania was a Calvinistic Methodist chapel in Aberdare, Rhondda Cynon Taf, Wales, which seated 550 people. Located near the centre of Aberdare, it had a somewhat concealed entrance and was approached up a long flight of steps.

The chapel was designated a Grade II-listed building on 1 October 1991. It closed in the early 1990s and has now been demolished.

History
The cause is said to have begun with the holding of a Sunday School at the Black Lion hotel, immediately in front of where the chapel was built. The first building, erected in 1853, was designed by Evan Griffiths of Aberdare and built by David Evans, on a field known as Cae Tirion which was part of the Ynyslwyd estate, at a cost of £500.

The minister from 1870 until 1908 was William James, a native of Trefin in Pembrokeshire. James became a member of the Aberdare School Board for several years.

Bethania's membership declined rapidly after the Second World War, although the opening of  briefly revived the Sunday School, allowing the then minister to address the children in Welsh for the first time or many years. In 1965 a service was held at Bethania to mark the centenary of the Welsh colony in Patagonia.

References

Bibliography

Chapels in Rhondda Cynon Taf
Aberdare
Grade II listed churches in Rhondda Cynon Taf
Former churches in Wales